Project SEED was a mathematics education program which worked in urban school districts across the United States.  Project SEED was a nonprofit organization that worked in partnership with school districts, universities, foundations, and corporations to teach advanced mathematics to elementary and middle school students as a supplement to their regular math instruction. Project SEED also provided professional development for classroom teachers. Founded in 1963 by William F. Johntz, its primary goal was to use mathematics to increase the educational options of low-achieving, at-risk students.

The model was to hire people with a high appreciation and love for mathemetics, for example, mathematicians, engineers, and physicists to be trained to teach. They were pre-trained in the program to teach Socratically, that is, only by asking questions of the students, rarely ever making statements, and even more rarely, validating or rejecting any answers given. A unique set of hand/arm signals were taught to then used by the students constantly throughout the 45 min. lesson to wave their agreement, disagreement, uncertainty, desire to ask a question, partial agreement or desire to amend, or to signal a high five to each answer given by a student to the instructor's leading question. Lessons were lively, rapid paced at times. The signals allowed students to support each other, while giving the instructor a way to guage who's understood, who hasn't got it yet, and even, who is not paying much attention. Various signals also supported classroom management. The classroom atmosphere was one of utmost respect for the inquiry process and students' participation. No student ever felt put down; when their fellow students respectfully disagreed, one was invited to state their case, and the whole class each individually would use whatever signal indicated whether they agreed or disagreed.  Logic, detection of patterns, drawing a picture of the problem, and many more reasoning skills were taught.  The curriculum addressed primarily algebra and some calculus -- math topics with which their regular classroom teacher was often not well versed.  Changing the expectations of the students' teachers, parents and family after they witnessed the students' mental abilities to understand and articulate many truths of mathematics, elevated their expectations for the students' academic abilities generating a more positive environment for their academic success.

About 
Project SEED is primarily a mathematics instruction program delivered to intact classes of elementary and middle school students, many from low-income backgrounds, to better prepare them for high school and college math. SEED Instruction utilized the Socratic method, in which instructors use a question-and-answer approach to guide students to the discovery of mathematical principles.

The SEED instructors are math subject specialists, with degrees in mathematics or math-based sciences, who use a variety of techniques including hand and arm signals to encourage high levels of involvement, focus and feedback from students of all achievement levels. The approach is intended to encourage active student learning, develop critical thinking, and strengthen articulation skills. The program also emphasizes assessment of student learning and adaptation of instruction to accommodate different math ability levels.

Project SEED curriculum included topics from advanced mathematics, such as advanced algebra, pre-calculus, group theory, number theory, calculus, and geometry. SEED instruction is supplemental to the regular math program. While teaching students, Project SEED Mathematics Specialists simultaneously provide professional development training for classroom teachers, through modeling and coaching in its instructional strategies.

History 
Founded by math teacher and psychologist William Johntz in 1963 to improve the educational outcomes of low-income and minority students, Project SEED was last run by CEO and National Director Hamid Ebrahimi.

Project SEED started as a result of Johntz teaching a remedial math class at Berkeley High School (Berkeley, California) in 1963. Frustrated by the failure of standard remediation to improve the basic math skills of his students, he began teaching them algebra using a Socratic, question-and-answer technique. They responded well to this new material that allowed them to think conceptually about mathematics, but since they were already in high school, there was little time left for them to turn around their academic careers.

Johntz began using his free periods to try the same strategies to teach Algebra in a nearby elementary school. These fifth and sixth graders responded with enthusiasm to succeeding in the study of a high school subject.  Also, this exploration of advanced concepts gave Johntz a chance to revisit and reinforce the grade-level curriculum.

Graduate students and faculty from U.C. Berkeley soon joined Johntz in other Berkeley schools. The program spread through presentations for school districts, corporations and conferences, and became a component of the Miller Mathematics Improvement Program, a program funded statewide in California from 1968 to 1970. Many of the early instructors were university faculty, graduate students, and corporate volunteers.
Project SEED became a non-profit, tax-exempt corporation in Michigan in 1970 where state funding brought the program to ten different cities between 1970 and 1975.  When it was founded in 1963, the name Project S.E.E.D. was an acronym for “Special Elementary Education for the Disadvantaged.” The program was reincorporated in California in 1987 as Project SEED, Inc. dropping the acronym. This was done primarily to avoid confusion with “Special Education” which had taken on a specific meaning.

Over the years Project SEED has operated in a number of cities and states with funding from state governments, federal grants, school districts, and foundations and corporations. From 1982 through 2002, a district funded program in Dallas, Texas reached tens of thousands of students and hundreds of teachers in dozens of schools. The series of longitudinal studies done by the district evaluation department during that time constitutes the most thorough examination of the effectiveness of Project SEED. Students in identified schools received a semester of Project SEED instruction for three consecutive years beginning in the second, third, or fourth grade, a program design that is now regarded as the preferred model. District teachers working in kindergarten through twelfth grade classrooms received workshops, in-class modeling, and coaching from SEED staff as a part of the Urban Systemic Initiative that was implemented in the Dallas & Detroit school districts in the mid 1990s. The Project SEED professional development program was based on this model. 

Hundreds of articles about Project SEED have appeared in newspapers and magazines as well as a number of academic books about successful intervention programs. Many former SEED instructors have gone on to make further important contributions to the field of mathematics education. Currently, Project SEED operated programs in California, Michigan, Indiana, Maryland, Pennsylvania, New Jersey, North Carolina, and Washington state.

Project SEED was dissolved in the early 21st century.

Evaluation and recognition 
Longitudinal evaluations over a number of years in different locations with different instructors demonstrate that:  Project SEED instruction has a positive impact on immediate mathematics achievement scores, Project SEED instruction has a long-term impact on mathematics achievement, and Project SEED students take more high-level mathematics courses in secondary schools.

The following organizations have recognized Project SEED as an effective mathematics education program:
 BEST (Building Engineering and Science Talent) panel 
 U.S. Department of Education Program Effectiveness Panel (PEP)/ National Diffusion Network (NDN)
 Eisenhower National Clearinghouse for Mathematics and Science Education

Notes

References 
Clewell, B. C., Anderson, B. T., & Thorpe, M. E. (1992). Breaking the barriers:  Helping female and minority students succeed in mathematics and science. San Francisco: Jossey-Bass Publishers.
Fashola, O. S., Slavin, R. E., Caldeón, M., & Durán, R. (1997).  Effective programs for Latino students.  Baltimore, MD: Center for Research on the Education of Students Placed At Risk.
Fashola, O. S., Slavin, R. E., & Calderón, M. (2001). Effective programs for Latino students in elementary and middle schools. In R. Slavin & M. Calderón (Eds.), Effective Programs for Latino Students. London & Mahwah, NJ: Lawrence Erlbaum Associates, Publishers.
Hilliard, A (2003). No mystery: Closing the achievement gap between Africans and excellence.  In T. Perry, C. Steele, & A. Hilliard, Young, gifted, and black:  Promoting high achievement among African-American students (pp. 131–165).  Boston: Beacon Press.
Hollins, E., Smiler, H., & Spencer, K. (1994). Benchmarks in meeting the challenges of effective schooling for African American youngsters.  In E. Hollins, J. King, & Hayman, W. (Eds.), Teaching diverse populations:  Formulating a knowledge base (pp. 166–174).  Albany, New York: State University of New York Press, 1994.
Mizer,  R., Howe, R., & Blosser, P. (1990).  Mathematics:  Promising and exemplary programs and materials in elementary and secondary schools.  Columbus, OH:  ERIC Clearinghouse for Science, Mathematics and Environmental Education.
Nisbett, R. E. (2009).  Intelligence and how to get it.  New York: W. W. Norton & Company.
Phillips, S. & Ebrahimi, H. (1993).  Equation for success:  Project SEED.  In G. Cuevas & M. Driscoll (Eds.), Reaching all students with mathematics (pp. 59–74).  Reston, VA: National Council of Teachers of Mathematics.
Slavin, R. E. & Lake, C.  (2007). Effective programs in elementary mathematics: A best-evidence synthesis.  Baltimore, MD: Johns Hopkins University.
Slavin, R. E., & Fashola, O. S. (1998).  Show me the evidence!  Proven and promising programs for America's schools.  Thousand Oaks, CA: Corwin Press.
Slavin, R. E. (2005). Evidence‐based reform: Advancing the education of students at risk.  Report prepared for Renewing Our Schools, Securing Our Future:  A National Task Force on Public Education (A joint initiative of the Center for American Progress and the Institute for America's Future).  Retrieved from http://www.americanprogress.org/ on 2011-09-22.
Webster, W. J., & Chadbourn, R. A. (1989).  The longitudinal effects of SEED instruction  on  mathematics achievement and  attitudes:  Final report. Dallas, TX:  Dallas Independent  School  District, TX Dept of Research, Evaluation, and Information Systems.
Webster, W. J., & Chadbourn, R. A. (1990).  The evaluation of Project SEED, 1989‐90. Dallas, TX:  Dallas Independent School District, TX Dept of Research, Evaluation, and Information Systems.
Webster, W. J., & Chadbourn, R. A. (1992).  The evaluation of Project SEED, 1990‐91.  Dallas, TX:  Dallas Independent School District, TX Dept of Evaluation and Planning Services.
Webster, W. J. (1992). The evaluation of Project SEED, 1991‐92, Detroit public schools. Retrieved from http://www.eric.ed.gov on 2011-09-22.
Webster, W. J., Dryden, M., Leddick, L., & Green, C. A. (1999).  Evaluation of Project SEED:  Detroit public schools, 1997‐98. Retrieved from http://www.eric.ed.gov on 2011-09-22.
Webster, William J. in association with Irene Lee and Mark A. Jones, “Evaluation of Project SEED 2009–2010, Compton Unified School District 2011.”

External links
Official Project SEED Website https://web.archive.org/web/20190220003024/http://www.projectseed.org/
http://morethancoins.wordpress.com/2011/04/15/nonprofit-of-the-week-project-seed/
http://articles.baltimoresun.com/2010-04-05/news/bal-op.seed0405_1_minority-students-project-seed-low-performing-students

Mathematics education in the United States